Sam Hunt Racing is an American professional stock car racing team that currently competes in the NASCAR Xfinity Series, fielding the No. 24 Toyota Supra primarily for Connor Mosack and the No. 26 Toyota Supra full-time for Kaz Grala.

The team is currently based in Mooresville, North Carolina, although they have Virginia roots and their original shop was located in Chester, Virginia.

History
The team, first known as DRIVE Technology, was founded in 2013 by Sam Hunt and Virginian Shayne Lockhart, a former NASCAR driver-turned crew chief. In 2013 they acquired assets from Joe Gibbs Racing's NASCAR K&N Pro Series East No. 18 team, which was closing down after the 2012 season. They kept using the No. 18. The team picked up sponsorship from the Denny Hamlin Foundation for most of the races.

At the end of 2019 Hunt announced the team would move up to the NASCAR Xfinity Series with their driver Colin Garrett in the season-finale at Homestead-Miami Speedway with Joe Gibbs Engines under the hood.

Xfinity Series
They started fielding the No. 26 in the NASCAR Xfinity Series in 2019 in the season finale at Homestead–Miami Speedway for Colin Garrett, he started 15th and would end up finishing 21st.

For the 2020 season, SHR formed a partnership with Toyota Racing Development in continuation with their partnership on engines with Joe Gibbs Engines.

In 2022, SHR began operating out of The Motorsports Group's former shop just up the road from the shop they had rented from Rette Jones Racing from 2020-2021 as well as forming a larger partnership with TRD on the technical side.

Car No. 24 history

2021
Starting at the Indy RC, SHR started fielding a 2nd entry in the No. 24 for Will Rodgers with continued Partnership from GoodRx where he finished 28th after starting in 9th.

2022
Jeffrey Earnhardt would drive the No. 24 at Daytona and would finish 15th. Joe Nemechek would attempt to race against his son John Hunter Nemechek however, due to qualifying being cancelled due to rain, the elder Nemechek did not qualify. He was originally entered for the Talladega race, but his entry was withdrawn because of the high chance of qualifying being rained out.

Car No. 24 results

Car No. 26 history

2019
On October 28, 2019, the team announced that they would field an Xfinity team for the first time in 2020, the No. 26 Toyota, with Garrett driving. Brian Keselowski became the team's crew chief, moving over from the Brandonbilt Motorsports No. 68 car. They later attempted the season finale at Homestead in 2019, where they qualified 15th and finished 20th in preparation for their 2020 schedule of races.

2020
In 2020 Colin Garrett ran select races for the team with a best finish of 14th at Homestead-Miami in June of that year.

Brandon Gdovic would join the team for 2 races at the Indianapolis Road Course and Daytona Road Course finishing 12th and 28th respectively.

On October 26, 2020, it was announced that TD2 driver Mason Diaz would drive the No. 26 Toyota for the final two races of the 2020 season at Martinsville and Phoenix.

2021
In 2021 the team ran the full schedule with a huge rotation of drivers Brandon Gdovic, Kris Wright, Santino Ferrucci, Colin Garrett, John Hunter Nemechek. Grant Enfinger, Will Rodgers, and Dylan Lupton splitting the seat.

The team recorded their first ever top 10 with Brandon Gdovic at the season opener at Daytona.

In September at Richmond Raceway the team scored their first ever top 5 with John Hunter Nemechek battling for the win in the closing laps with Justin Haley and eventual race winner Noah Gragson going on to score a 3rd-place finish.

2022
On January 13, 2022 Ryan Truex was announced to drive the No. 26 at Daytona as well as several other races throughout the season and the next day Jeffrey Earnhardt was announced to compete in at least 7 races bringing sponsorship from ForeverLawn.

On January 25, 2022, it was announced John Hunter Nemechek would drive the car at both races at Las Vegas in the season with sponsorship from Berry's Bullets. Other drivers such as Parker Chase, Derek Griffith, and Chandler Smith would also drive the No. 26.

On October 27, 2022, it was announced that Kaz Grala would drive the car in the season finale at Phoenix Raceway on November 5, 2022, marking Grala's Toyota Racing debut.

Car No. 26 results

K&N Pro Series

Car No. 18 history

2013
In 2013 Sam Hunt along with former-driver turned crew chief Shayne Lockhart formed DRIVE Technology after they had acquired assets from Joe Gibbs Racing's NASCAR K&N Pro Series East No. 18 team, which was closing down after the 2012 season. Sam Hunt, ran the full season, moving over from Precision Performance Motorsports. They kept using the No. 18. The team picked up sponsorship from the Denny Hamlin Foundation for most of the races. The team later ended up running only part-time, skipping the races at Five Flags, Winston-Salem, both Iowa races, and New Hampshire. Also, Sergio Peña drove the car at the season-finale at Road Atlanta instead of Hunt.

2014
In 2014, Hunt ran another part-time schedule. One of his races was set to be Daytona, but after full-time driver Brandon Jones failed to qualify in his own No. 33 car for Turner Scott Motorsports, he replaced Hunt in the No. 18. Other drivers for the team that year were Mason Massey in two races at the Langley and Columbus Speedways. Venezuelan female driver Milka Duno drove the No. 18 at the season-finale, now at Dover as a result of Road Atlanta being taken off the schedule.

2015
The team attempted fewer races in 2015. Peyton Sellers drove two races at Greenville-Pickens Speedway and at Dover. Full-time ARCA Series driver Sarah Cornett-Ching drove the car at Bristol in a partnership between DRIVE Technology and her ARCA team, RACE 101. Justin LaDuke made his only start of the year and to-date of his career at Winston-Salem. Hunt returned for two races at tracks in his home state of Virginia: Langley and Richmond.

2016
The team continued to scale back in 2016, with Peña returning to DRIVE Technology for the first time in three years after he was released from Rev Racing. He ran the road course race at Virginia International Raceway, and it is his last NASCAR start to date. The team withdrew with Hunt at the next race at Dominion Raceway, another track in Virginia.

2017
Hunt became the sole owner of the team in 2017. He and Peyton Sellers ran two races apiece that year. The new team name was Hunt-Sellers Racing.

2018
HSR ran nearly the full season in 2018, with yet another driver from Virginia, rookie Colin Garrett, running all but the first two races of the season. Garrett originally signed on for four races but extended it to the remainder of the schedule after strong initial runs. He finished tenth in points. His best finish was a third at the first of the doubleheader races at South Boston, his only top-5 of the year. Garrett did score four top-10's as well. Clinton Cram served as crew chief in 2018.

2019
The team announced on January 17, 2019, that Garrett would return to Sam Hunt Racing to run the full season with them in 2019. In addition, the team switched from Toyota to Chevrolet that year.

References

External links
 Drive Technology USA 
 

NASCAR teams
ARCA Menards Series teams
Auto racing teams established in 2013